Digitivalva kasachstanica is a moth of the family Acrolepiidae. It is found in Kazakhstan.

References

Acrolepiidae
Moths described in 1994